LS IV-14 116 is a hot subdwarf located approximately 2,000 light years away on the border between the constellations Capricornus and Aquarius. It has a surface temperature of approximately 34,000 ± 500 kelvins. Along with stars HE 2359-2844 and HE 1256-2738, LS IV-14 116 forms a new group of star called heavy metal subdwarfs. These are thought to be stars contracting to the extended horizontal branch after a helium flash and ejection of their atmospheres at the tip of the red giant branch.

The star contains 10,000 times more zirconium than the Sun; it also has between 1,000 and 10,000 times the amount of strontium, germanium and yttrium than the Sun. The heavy metals are believed to be in cloud layers in the atmosphere where the ions of each metal have a particular opacity that allows radiational levitation to balance gravitational settling.

References

External links
 Most zirconium-rich star discovered
 Distant Star Enveloped By Ingredients for Fake Diamonds

Aquarius (constellation)
B-type subdwarfs
J20573887-1425437
Very rapidly pulsating hot stars
Chemically peculiar stars